Storms in May (German: Gewitter im Mai) is a 1938 German drama film directed by Hans Deppe and starring Viktor Staal, Hansi Knoteck and Ludwig Schmid-Wildy.

It was based on the 1904 novel of the same title by Ludwig Ganghofer which had previously been made into a 1920 silent film of the same title. It was shot on location in Hamburg, Bavaria, Austria and Switzerland.

The film's sets were designed by the art directors Kurt Dürnhöfer and Hans Kuhnert.

Cast
 Viktor Staal as Poldi Sonnleitner  
 Hansi Knoteck as Dorle Weber  
 Ludwig Schmid-Wildy as Domini, Dorfschmied  
 Anny Seitz as Vroni  
 Hans Richter as Hein Andresen  
 Hermine Ziegler as Dorles Mutter  
 Rolf Pinegger as Förster, Poldis Vater  
 Thea Aichbichler as Försterin, Poldis Mutter  
 Viktor Gehring as Bürgermeister  
 Josef Eichheim as Xaver, Gemeindediener  
 Willi Schur as Schiffskoch  
 Günther Brackmann 
 Gerhard Dammann 
 Otti Dietze as Wirtschafterin  
 Philipp Manning 
 Else Reval 
 Roland von Rossi 
 Hans Schneider 
 Maria Wolf

References

Bibliography
 Waldman, Harry. Nazi Films in America, 1933-1942. McFarland, 2008.

External links 
 

1938 films
1938 drama films
German drama films
Films of Nazi Germany
1930s German-language films
Films directed by Hans Deppe
Films based on works by Ludwig Ganghofer
Films based on German novels
Remakes of German films
Sound film remakes of silent films
UFA GmbH films
German black-and-white films
Films set in Bavaria
Films set in the Alps
1930s German films